"The Eye" is the seventh episode of the first season of the American fantasy television series The Lord of the Rings: The Rings of Power, based on the novel The Lord of the Rings and its appendices by J. R. R. Tolkien. Set in the Second Age of Middle-earth, thousands of years before Tolkien's The Hobbit and The Lord of the Rings, it explores the aftermath of the volcanic eruption from the previous episode. "The Eye" was written by Jason Cahill and directed by Charlotte Brändström.

Amazon made a multi-season commitment for a new The Lord of the Rings series in November 2017. J. D. Payne and Patrick McKay were set to develop it in July 2018. Filming for the first season took place in New Zealand, and work on episodes beyond the first two began in January 2021. Brändström was revealed to be directing two episodes of the season that May, including the seventh episode. Production wrapped for the season in August 2021.

"The Eye" premiered on the streaming service Amazon Prime Video on October 7, 2022. It was estimated to have high viewership and received generally positive reviews.

Plot 
The Elf Galadriel wakes up covered in ash following the eruption of the mountain Orodruin. The village of Tirharad is covered in ash and fire, with many dead and injured. Galadriel finds the human boy Theo and together they begin making their way out of the Southlands. Númenórean soldiers Isildur and Valandil find their friend Ontamo dead. They help Queen Regent Míriel rescue survivors from a burning building, but it collapses and Míriel loses her eyesight. Isildur is presumed dead in the collapse.

The Harfoots finish their migration to the Grove, an orchard that has been destroyed by the nearby volcano. They ask the magical stranger who has joined them to help fix the orchard, but his attempts lead to a large tree branch landing on Nori and Dilly Brandyfoot. Scared, the Harfoots decide the stranger should leave. Harfoot elder Sadoc Burrows gives him directions to a nearby settlement of Men and the stranger departs. The next day, the Harfoots awake to the whole orchard regrown. That night, a trio of mysterious women arrive in search of the stranger. Nori attempts to send them in the wrong direction but the women use magic to burn all of the Harfoots's caravans and then continue after the stranger. Nori decides to go after him to warn him of the danger, and is accompanied by her friend Poppy Proudfellow, her mother Marigold, and Sadoc.

Galadriel and Theo bond over their shared guilt for the events leading to the eruption, and Galadriel discusses her husband Celeborn whom she believes to be dead. They eventually reach the Númenórean's camp outside of the Southlands where Theo reunited with his mother Bronwyn and her beloved, the Elf Arondir. Isildur's father Elendil learns of his son's loss and despairs, regretting his part in joining Galadriel's quest that led to this moment. When Isildur's horse cannot be calmed, Elendil lets the horse gallop off. Before the Númenórean's depart Middle-earth in their ships, Míriel promises to return and seek revenge against the enemy. Galadriel is reunited with Halbrand, the King of the Southlands, who was gravely injured during the eruption. She helps him ride north to receive Elvish medecine. The other human survivors seek refuge in nearby Pelargir.

In Khazad-dûm, the Elf Elrond and Dwarf Prince Durin IV ask King Durin III for permission to mine the new ore mithril so it can be used to counteract the fading power of the Elves in Middle-earth. Durin III refuses, believing the ore to be too dangerous to mine. As Elrond departs with a tearful farewell for Durin IV and his wife Disa, Durin IV sees proof that mithril can save the Elves and decides to mine it with Elrond in secret. They find a large deposit of the ore, but are caught by Durin III. Elrond is banished, taking a small piece of mithril with him, and Durin IV is stripped of his royal status. Durin III orders the mithril mine be sealed. Unbeknownst to them all, a Balrog lives deep below that mine.

In the Southlands, the Orcs and their human allies name their leader, Adar, "Lord of the Southlands". He says that place no longer exists: it is now the land of Mordor.

Production

Development 
Amazon acquired the global television rights for J. R. R. Tolkien's The Lord of the Rings in November 2017. The company's streaming service, Amazon Prime Video, gave a multi-season commitment to a series based on the novel and its appendices, to be produced by Amazon Studios. It was later titled The Lord of the Rings: The Rings of Power. Amazon hired J. D. Payne and Patrick McKay to develop the series and serve as showrunners in July 2018. Jason Cahill had joined the series as a writer by July 2019, and Charlotte Brändström was revealed to be directing two episodes of the first season in May 2021. The series is set in the Second Age of Middle-earth, thousands of years before the events of Tolkien's The Hobbit and The Lord of the Rings, and the first season focuses on introducing the setting and major heroic characters to the audience. Written by Cahill and directed by Brändström, the seventh episode is titled "The Eye".

Casting 

The series' large cast includes Cynthia Addai-Robinson as Míriel, Robert Aramayo as Elrond, Owain Arthur as Durin IV, Maxim Baldry as Isildur, Nazanin Boniadi as Bronwyn, Morfydd Clark as Galadriel, Ismael Cruz Córdova as Arondir, Lenny Henry as Sadoc Burrows, Markella Kavenagh as Elanor "Nori" Brandyfoot, Tyroe Muhafidin as Theo, Lloyd Owen as Elendil, Megan Richards as Poppy Proudfellow, Dylan Smith as Largo Brandyfoot, Charlie Vickers as Halbrand, Daniel Weyman as the Stranger, and Sara Zwangobani as Marigold Brandyfoot. Also starring are Alex Tarrant as Valandil, Anthony Crum as Ontamo, Beau Cassidy as Dilly Brandyfoot, Thusitha Jayasundera as Malva, Maxine Cunliffe as Vilma, Peter Mullan as Durin III, Joseph Mawle as Adar, Geoff Morrell as Waldreg, Edith Poor as the Nomad, Kali Kopae as the Ascetic, Bridie Sisson as the Dweller.

Filming 
Amazon confirmed in September 2019 that filming for the first season would take place in New Zealand, where the Lord of the Rings and Hobbit film trilogies were made. Filming primarily took place at Kumeu Film Studios and Auckland Film Studios in Auckland, under the working title Untitled Amazon Project or simply UAP. Production on episodes beyond the first two began in January 2021, and Brändström was in New Zealand for production in May. Filming for the season wrapped on August 2.

Visual effects 
Visual effects for the episode were created by Industrial Light & Magic (ILM), Wētā FX, Method Studios, Rodeo FX, Cause and FX, Atomic Arts, and Cantina Creative. The different vendors were overseen by visual effects supervisor Jason Smith. He explained that the Balrog seen at the end of the episode was a new design by concept artist Allen Williams that derived from existing artwork but had its own face and horn shapes.

Music 

A soundtrack album featuring composer Bear McCreary's score for the episode was released on Amazon Music on October 6, 2022. McCreary said the album contained "virtually every second of score" from the episode. It was added to other music streaming services after the full first season was released. All music composed by Bear McCreary:

Release 
"The Eye" premiered on Prime Video in the United States on October 7, 2022. It was released at the same time around the world, in more than 240 countries and territories.

Reception

Viewership 
Software company Whip Media, who track viewership data for the 21 million worldwide users of their TV Time app, calculated that for the week ending October 9, two days after the episode's debut, The Rings of Power remained the second-highest original streaming series for U.S. viewership, behind Disney+'s She-Hulk: Attorney at Law. Nielsen Media Research, who record streaming viewership on U.S. television screens, estimated that the series was watched for 988 million minutes during the week ending October 9. This kept the series in third-place on the company's list of top streaming series and films, behind only Netflix's Dahmer – Monster: The Jeffrey Dahmer Story and Disney+'s Hocus Pocus 2. Parrot Analytics determines audience "demand expressions" based on various data sources, including social media activity and comments on rating platforms. During the week ending October 14, the company calculated that The Rings of Power was 38.7 times more in demand than the average U.S. streaming series, a 25 percent increase that moved it up to third on the company's top 10 list for the week.

Critical response 

The review aggregator website Rotten Tomatoes reported an 82% approval rating with an average score of 7.6/10 based on 22 reviews. The website's critics consensus reads: "'The Eye' blinks when it comes to fully capitalizing on the momentum that its predecessor's volcanic climax promised, but it succeeds admirably in dovetailing plotlines and teeing up a cohesive finale."

Companion media 
An episode of the official aftershow Deadline's Inside the Ring: LOTR: The Rings of Power for "The Eye" was released on October 8, 2022. Hosted by Deadline Hollywood Dominic Patten and Anthony D'Alessandro, it features exclusive "footage and insights" for the episode, plus interviews with cast members Aramayo, Arthur, Addai-Robinson, Clark, Vickers, Muhafidin, Baldry, and Gravelle as well as Brändström and McCreary. On October 14, The Official The Lord of the Rings: The Rings of Power Podcast was released on Amazon Music. Hosted by actress Felicia Day, the seventh episode is dedicated to "The Eye" and features Brändström, Payne, and McKay. On November 21, a bonus segment featuring behind-the-scenes footage from the episode was added to Prime Video's X-Ray feature as part of a series titled "The Making of The Rings of Power".

References

External links 
 

2022 American television episodes
The Lord of the Rings: The Rings of Power